The Athletics World Cup was a team-based international athletics competition held in 2018.

It featured eight national teams based on world rankings, with each team entering one athlete per event, and points gained on the basis of finishing position. Although the majority of world championship events were contested, no races over 1500 metres were held, and no road events or multi-events were on the program. The competition focused on an overall team prize, the Platinum Trophy and Platinum team medals, but individual gold, silver and bronze medals were also awarded in each individual event.

While the event is organised outside of the official World Athletics structures, at the time the IAAF expressed support for the event notwithstanding the existence of its own IAAF Continental Cup event.

The event was branded a failure by sports journalists, with many big-name star athletes failing to take part. The event was discontinued after its first edition.

Editions

History
The competition was announced on 5 February 2018 with London hosting the inaugural event. All events were held at London Stadium on 14 & 15 July 2018.

Competition structure
The competition featured just 8 nations taking part in all events over two days. Each nation entered one male and one female athlete in every event in a straight final format. For its inaugural event, all nations' captains were female in celebration of 100 years since women were given the right to vote in the United Kingdom.

Events 
In 2018, the following events were contested: 100 metres, 200 metres, 400 metres, 800 metres, 1500 metres, 100 metre hurdles (women), 110 metre hurdles (men), 400 metre hurdles, 4 x 100 metres relay, 4 x 400 metres relay, long jump, triple jump, shot put, discus throw, javelin throw, hammer throw, pole vault and high jump.

Nations

2018 
The following eight nations competed in 2018:

  China
  France
  Germany
  Great Britain and Northern Ireland (host)
  Jamaica
  Poland
  South Africa
  United States

These nations were selected from the top performing nations at the 2017 World Championships in Athletics over the World Cup events. Traditional distance-running powers, Kenya and Ethiopia, were ranked among the first eight nations in the placing table overall at the 2017 Championships, but were not invited as they finished outside the top eight when considering only World Cup events.

Media coverage
On 20 June 2018, Sky Sports were announced as the host broadcaster within the UK and Ireland. They exclusively broadcast both evenings of the competition and also produced the world feed for other nations.

See also
World Athletics Continental Cup

References

External links
Home page

 
World cups
Recurring sporting events established in 2018
International athletics competitions
Team combination track and field competitions